Location Hunting in Palestine or Sopralluoghi in Palestina per il vangelo secondo Matteo is a 1965 Italian documentary film directed by Pier Paolo Pasolini.

Cast

External links
 

1965 films
1960s Italian-language films
Italian documentary films
Films directed by Pier Paolo Pasolini
1965 documentary films
1960s Italian films